Diacylglycerol kinase theta is an enzyme that in humans is encoded by the DGKQ gene.

The protein encoded by this gene contains three cysteine-rich domains, a proline-rich region, and a pleckstrin homology domain with an overlapping Ras-associating domain. It is localized in the speckle domains of the nucleus, and mediates the regeneration of phosphatidylinositol (PI) from diacylglycerol in the PI-cycle during cell signal transduction.

Interactions
DGKQ has been shown to interact with RHOA.

References

Further reading